2 Trumpets is an album by trumpeters Art Farmer and Donald Byrd, recorded in 1956 and released on the Prestige label. They are joined by Jackie McLean in the front line for the uptempo pieces but have a ballad quartet track apiece.

Reception

In a contemporaneous review, Billboard was positive, commenting that it is a "very enjoyable LP for the modern jazz customer". In Ron Wynn's review for Allmusic, he stated: "This nice date puts two top trumpets together". The Penguin Guide to Jazz gave it two-and-a-half stars out of four, describing it as "capable but routine".

Track listing
 "The Third" (Donald Byrd) – 7:42    
 "Contour" (Kenny Drew) – 7:38    
 "When Your Lover Has Gone" (Einar Aaron Swan) – 5:13    
 "Dig" (Miles Davis) – 14:29    
 "'Round Midnight" (Thelonious Monk, Cootie Williams, Bernie Hanighen) – 6:38

Personnel
Art Farmer – trumpet (tracks 1–4) 
Donald Byrd – trumpet (tracks 1, 2, 4 & 5)
Jackie McLean – alto saxophone (tracks 1, 2 & 4)
Barry Harris – piano
Doug Watkins – bass 
Art Taylor – drums

References 

Prestige Records albums
Art Farmer albums
Donald Byrd albums
1957 albums
Albums recorded at Van Gelder Studio
Albums produced by Bob Weinstock
Instrumental albums